Pleurotomella maitasi is a species of sea snail, a marine gastropod mollusk in the family Raphitomidae.

Description

Distribution
This marine species occurs in the Scotia Sea.

References

 Engl W. (2008) Pleurotomella maitasi n. sp. and P. raineri n. sp., two new abyssal Turrids from the Antarctic (Mollusca, Gastropoda: Turridae). Antarctic Mollusks, Part 11. Club Conchylia Informationen 39(3–4): 57–59 
 Engl, W. (2012). Shells of Antarctica. Hackenheim: Conchbooks. 402 pp.

External links
 Kantor Y.I., Harasewych M.G. & Puillandre N. (2016). A critical review of Antarctic Conoidea (Neogastropoda). Molluscan Research. 36(3): 153–206
 Biolib.cz: image

maitasi
Gastropods described in 2008